The 2015 MENA Golf Tour was the fifth season of the MENA Golf Tour.

Schedule
The following table lists official events during the 2015 season.

Order of Merit
The Order of Merit was based on prize money won during the season, calculated using a points-based system. James Allan led the amateur Order of Merit.

Notes

References

MENA Golf Tour